Stella Uchenwa Obiageli Ngwu  (born 9 July 1958) is a Nigerian politician from Enugu State, Nigeria. She is an indigene of Ukehe in Igbo-Etiti Local Government Area of Enugu State. She represented Igbo-Etiti/Uzo-Uwani Federal Constituency in the House of Representatives from 2011 to 2019 under the People's Democratic Party. In 2016, the  Federal High Court, Abuja Division sacked her from the House but she won re-election in 2017.

References

Living people
21st-century Nigerian women politicians
Members of the House of Representatives (Nigeria)
Enugu State politicians
Igbo people
Peoples Democratic Party (Nigeria) politicians
Women members of the House of Representatives (Nigeria)
21st-century Nigerian politicians
1958 births